Oxytropis lambertii commonly known as purple locoweed, Colorado locoweed, Lambert's crazy weed, or Lambert’s Locoweed is a species of flowering plant in the legume family.

Distribution
It is native to grasslands in the Canadian Prairie of central Canada and in the mid-west and Great Plains of the United States from Texas to Manitoba and west to Arizona and Montana.

Description
Oxytropis lambertii is a perennial herb producing a patch of basal leaves around the root crown, and several showy erect inflorescences. The leaf is compound with several silvery-green leaflets. The inflorescence produces several flowers, each borne in a tubular purple or pinkish calyx of sepals covered thinly in silver hairs. The pealike flower corolla is reddish or bluish purple with a lighter patch at the base of the banner. The fruit is a cylindrical legume pod.

Toxic
The Oxytropis lambertii plant is one of the locoweeds most frequently implicated in livestock poisoning. The toxin is called swainsonine. Research suggests that the plant itself may not be toxic, but becomes toxic when inhabited by endophytic fungi of the genus Embellisia, which produce swainsonine.

See also
Locoweed

References

External links

USDA Plants Profile - Oxytropis lambertii
Kansas Wildflowers
Oxytropis lambertii - Photo gallery

lambertii
 Flora of the South-Central United States
Flora of Arizona
Flora of British Columbia
Flora of Colorado
Flora of Iowa
Flora of Kansas
Flora of Manitoba
Flora of Minnesota
Flora of Missouri
Flora of Nebraska
Flora of North Dakota
Flora of Oklahoma
Flora of Saskatchewan
Flora of South Dakota
Flora of Utah
Flora of the United States
Flora of the Canadian Prairies
Flora without expected TNC conservation status